Constable Koothuru is a 1963 Telugu-language film directed by Tapi Chanakya. It is a remake of the 1962 Tamil film Policekaran Magal, itself based on a play with the same name. The film stars Jaggayya, Krishna Kumari, రాజశ్రీ Gummadi and Kanta Rao. This was J. Jayalalithaa's first appearance as a child star in Telugu cinema.

Plot 
Dharmayya is an honest police constable who has two children: Gopi and Janaki. Gopi's friend Raghu is the spoilt son of a wealthy man named Venkatramayya. One day, Dharmayya raids a bar and catches Raghu gambling and arrests him, this leaves a bad opinion of Raghu on Dharmayya. In an attempt to change Raghu's lifestyle, Venkatramayya decides to marry off his niece Mallika to Raghu. But before the marriage, Raghu meets Janaki and they fall in love with each other. When Dharmayya finds out about Janaki's love, he reluctantly agrees to it. Raghu is later framed for assassination by his old friends Jackie and Joker. The rest of the film deals with whether Raghu will marry Janaki, and how he will prove his innocence.

Cast 
 Gummadi as Dharmayya
 Jaggayya as Gopi
 Krishna Kumari as Janaki
 Kanta Rao as Raghu
 Film News Anandan as a police photographer
 Jayalalithaa (special appearance in the song "Andham Kosam Kannulu")

Production 
Constable Koothuru is a remake of the 1962 Tamil film Policekaran Magal, itself based on a play with the same name. Film News Anandan, who played a police photographer in the original film, reprised his role in this film. Jayalalithaa made her Telugu debut with this film, appearing as a dancer in the song "Andham Kosam Kannulu". Cinematography was handled by D.L. Narayana, and the editing by N. M. Shankar.

Soundtrack 
The soundtrack of the film was composed by R. Govardhanam.

References

External links 
 

1960s Telugu-language films
Indian drama films
Telugu remakes of Tamil films
Indian films based on plays
Films directed by Tapi Chanakya
Films based on adaptations
1963 drama films
1963 films